Diacamma ceylonense, also known as Sri Lanka queenless ant, is a species of ant of the subfamily Ponerinae. It is a widespread species.

Subspecies
Diacamma ceylonense ceylonense Santschi, 1932 - India, Sri Lanka
Diacamma ceylonense orbiculatum Emery, 1897 - Laos

References

Animaldiversity.org

External links

 at antwiki.org
Itis.org

Ponerinae
Hymenoptera of Asia
Insects described in 1897